Elisa Sidler (born 23 January 1932) is a Swiss sprint canoer who competed in the early 1950s. She competed in the K-1 500 m event at the 1952 Summer Olympics in Helsinki, but was eliminated in the heats.

References
Elisa Sidler's profiel at Sports Reference.com

External links
 

1932 births
Canoeists at the 1952 Summer Olympics
Olympic canoeists of Switzerland
Possibly living people
Swiss female canoeists